Robert Clark Penner is an American mathematician whose work in geometry and combinatorics has found applications in high-energy physics and more recently in theoretical biology. He is the son of Sol Penner, an aerospace engineer.

Biography 
Robert Clark Penner received his B.S. degree from Cornell University in 1977 and his Ph.D. from the Massachusetts Institute of Technology in 1981, the latter under the direction of James Munkres and David Gabai. In his doctoral studies, he solved a 50 year old 
problem posed by Max Dehn on the action of the mapping class group on curves and arcs in surfaces, developed  combinatorial aspects of Thurston's theory of train tracks and generalized Thurston's construction of pseudo-Anosov maps.

After postdoctoral positions at Princeton University and at the Mittag-Leffler Institute, Penner spent most of the period of 1985–2003 at the University of Southern California. From 2004 until 2012, he worked at Aarhus University, where he co-founded with Jørgen Ellegaard Andersen the Center for the Quantum Geometry of Moduli Spaces. Since 2013 Penner has held the position of the Rene Thom Chair in Mathematical Biology at the Institut des Hautes Etudes Scientifiques.

Throughout his career Penner held various visiting positions around the world including Harvard University, Stanford University, Max-Planck-Institut für Mathematik at Bonn, University of Tokyo, Mittag-Leffler Institute, Caltech, UCLA, Fields Institute, University of Chicago, ETH Zurich, University of Bern, University of Helsinki, University of Strasbourg, University of Grenoble, Nonlinear Institute of Nice-Sophia Antipolis.

Contributions to mathematics, physics, and biology
Penner's research began in the theory of train tracks including a generalization of Thurston's original construction of pseudo-Anosov maps to the so-called Penner-Thurston construction, which he used to give estimates on least dilatations.  He then co-discovered the so-called Epstein-Penner decomposition of non-compact complete hyperbolic manifolds with David Epstein, in dimension 3 a central tool in knot theory.   Over several years he developed the decorated Teichmüller theory of punctured surfaces including the so-called Penner matrix model, the basic partition function for Riemann's moduli space.  Extending the foregoing to orientation-preserving homeomorphisms of the circle, Penner developed his model of universal Teichmüller theory together with its Lie algebra. He discovered
combinatorial cocycles with Shigeyuki Morita for the first and with Nariya Kawazumi for the higher Johnson homomorphisms.  Penner has also contributed to theoretical biology in joint work with Jørgen E. Andersen et al.
discovering a priori geometric constraints on protein geometry, and with Michael S. Waterman, Piotr Sulkowski, Christian Reidys et al. introducing and solving the matrix model for RNA topology.

Main journal publications

Books
 with the assistance of J. L. Harer: Combinatorics of Train Tracks, Annals of Mathematical Studies  125,  Princeton University Press (1992); second printing (2001).
Perspectives in Mathematical Physics, International Press, edited by  R.C. Penner and Shing-Tung Yau (1994).
Discrete Mathematics--proof techniques and mathematical structures, World Scientific Publishing Company (1999); second printing (2001).
 Woods Hole Mathematics: perspectives in math and physics, edited by N. Tongring and R.C. Penner, foreword by Raul Bott, World Scientific Publishing Company (2004).
 Groups of Diffeomorphisms-in honor of Shigeyuki Morita on the occasion of his 60th birthday, Advanced Studies in Pure Mathematics 52 (2008), Mathematical Society of Japan, edited by R.C. Penner, D. Kotschick, T. Tsuboi, N. Kawazumi, T. Kitano, Y. Mitsumatsu.
 Decorated Teichmüller theory, (with a foreword by Yuri I. Manin), QGM Master Class Series, European Mathematical Society, Zürich, 2012,  xviii+360 pp. .
 Topology and K-theory: Lectures by Daniel Quillen, Notes by Robert Penner, Springer-Verlag Lecture Notes in Mathematics (2020)

Patents

Methods of Digital Filtering and Multi-Dimensional Data Compression Using the Farey Quadrature and Arithmetic, Fan, and Modular Wavelets, US Patent 7,158,569 (granted 2Jan07)

Philanthropy

In 2018 Penner endowed the Alexzandria Figueroa and Robert Penner Chair at the IHES in memoriam of Alexzandria Figueroa.

References

21st-century American mathematicians
Combinatorialists
Geometers
Cornell University alumni
Massachusetts Institute of Technology alumni
University of Southern California faculty
Academic staff of Aarhus University
Living people
Year of birth missing (living people)